Kon Tum is the capital city of Kon Tum Province in Vietnam. It is located inland in the Central Highlands region of Vietnam, near the borders of Laos and Cambodia.

History

After the People's Army of Vietnam invaded South Vietnam on March 30, 1972 during the Easter Offensive, two divisions attempted to capture Kon Tum, but failed. In March 1975, however, Kon Tum was overrun during the Ho Chi Minh Campaign and large numbers of refugees were forced to flee east to the south central coast.

Kon Tum has several vestiges of the French colonial period, as well as several tribal villages directly in the suburbs of the Vietnamese-reconstructed town. Among the town's landmarks, there is a Roman Catholic wooden church on discrete stilts and a large French-built seminary which hosts a small museum on local hill tribes. French missionary presence in Kon Tum traces back to 1851.

Climate
Kon Tum has a tropical savanna climate (Köppen Aw) with a wet season from April to November, a dry season from November to April, and consistently very warm to hot temperatures with high to oppressive humidity year-round.

References

External links 
 Kontum government home page (Vietnamese)
 The Battle of Kontum
 

Provincial capitals in Vietnam
Districts of Kon Tum province
Populated places in Kon Tum province
Cities in Vietnam